Vidas Opostas (Tangled Lives) is a Portuguese telenovela which began airing on SIC on 9 April 2018 and ended on 10 May 2019.

Plot 
Life is good to EVA. She loves husband MARCO, has a job that makes her feel fulfilled and is pregnant with her first child. Little does she know her World is about to crumble!

EVA finds out MARCO has been cheating on her and that their marriage is a front with even more unpredictable consequences. MARCO is in fact in love with MARIA. They have maintained a relationship for over two years and have a baby daughter.

MARCO works for a big sports fashion entrepreneur, ÁLVARO, who also set up an illegal doping network. He worked for the network. Reason why he married EVA, so he can spy on her, pass on secret intelligence and operations to the network, since she worked for an anti-doping agency.

When MARCO finds himself responsible for the death of ÁLVARO's son, an up-and-coming football star, he becomes a wanted man! His former boss will want nothing but to kill him. ÁLVARO must be careful, so no one discovers his illegal business.

JORGE is a journalist who will return from Canada to investigate his brother MARCO's secret life. He will fall in love with ex-sister-in-law EVA and discover he has a niece, building a relationship with MARIA.

On the other hand, ÁLVARO's son RICARDO will also try to discover who killed his brother, which leads him to MARIA. He will fall deeply in love with her once he realizes she was never MARCO's accomplice. But MARIA will have to prove her innocence to his family.

This is how EVA and MARIA will confront each other. Their lives will be forever tangled through the man who fooled them. They will fight to the end against MARCO, to regain their life and protect their families.

Cast

Special Guest Cast

Awards and nominations

References

2018 Portuguese television series debuts
Portuguese telenovelas
2018 telenovelas
Sociedade Independente de Comunicação telenovelas
Portuguese-language telenovelas